Artists Society De Kring was founded on September 23, 1922, by artists and intellectuals who looked for a home away from home in Amsterdam.

De Kring is a private club and becoming a member takes place by means of ballot.

References

External links
 De Kring Website

Arts organisations based in the Netherlands
Arts organizations established in 1922
1922 establishments in the Netherlands